Daniel H. Bays (1942 – May 9, 2019) was an American historian of China, best known for his works on Christianity in China.

Biography 
Bays was born in 1942 in St. Joseph, Michigan, received his B.A. in history from Stanford University in 1964, an M.A. in Far Eastern studies from the University of Michigan in 1967, and a PhD in history of modern China from the University of Michigan in 1971. His PhD dissertation was on the Chinese politician Zhang Zhidong in the midst of China's late-imperial quest for modernity.

After completing his PhD, Bays took up a post teaching history at the University of Kansas, directing the Center for East Asian Studies and becoming a full professor in 1985. After working there for thirty years, in 2000, Bays moved to the History Department of Calvin College, where he held the Spoelhof chair from 2000–2002. He retired from Calvin College in 2012 and was appointed as professor emeritus, though he relocated with his wife Janice to Kansas City, Missouri.

In 1984, when Bays was a Fulbright scholar in Taiwan, he received a letter from the historian of China, John K. Fairbank, who encouraged him to conduct a more systematic study of Christianity in China, a topic Bays had recently begun work on. This would lead to his launch of the History of Christianity in China Project, which resulted in the edited volume Christianity in China: From the Eighteenth Century to the Present, published in 1996.

Bays died on May 9, 2019, after a lengthy battle with Parkinson's disease.

Works

Books

Edited

References

External links 

 Personal Papers of Daniel Bays (1970–2001), University of Kansas Library

1942 births
2019 deaths
Religion academics
American historians
Christian missions in China
World Christianity scholars
History of Christianity in China
University of Michigan College of Literature, Science, and the Arts alumni
Stanford University alumni
Calvin University faculty
University of Kansas staff
University of Michigan alumni